A Little Sister of Everybody, sometimes called A Little Sister to Everybody, is a 1918 American silent comedy-drama film directed by Robert Thornby and starring Bessie Love and George Fisher. It was produced by Anderson-Brunton Company and distributed by Pathé.

The film is presumed lost.

Plot 
Hugh Travers, Jr. (Fisher) is left in charge of a large manufacturing business in Manhattan's Lower East Side through the death of his father, and is confronted by considerable unrest among the employees due to the socialist doctrines preached by Ivan Marask (Sarno). Disguising himself as a poor factory worker, he labors in his own mill and thus becomes interested in Nicholas Marinoff (Dowling), a socialist writer, and his niece Celeste Janvier (Love). Discharged for inciting the workers to violence, Marask determines to kill Travers. He tells Celeste of his intention and they both arrive at the Travers home at the same time. The young woman spoils his aim so the shot meant for Travers goes wild. Marask is astonished to discover that the man he knew as Hughes is Travers, and his astonishment is shared by Celeste. Travers tells them of his planned reforms for the employees and of his love for Celeste.

Cast 
 Bessie Love as Celeste Janvier
 Joseph J. Dowling as Nicholas Marinoff
 Hector Sarno as Ivan Marask
 George Fisher as Hugh Travers, Jr.

Production 
A Little Sister of Everybody was filmed at Paralta Studio in Los Angeles.

Release and reception 
The film received mixed reviews.

Like many American films of the time, A Little Sister of Everybody was subject to cuts by city and state film censorship boards. For example, the Chicago Board of Censors cut, in Reel 4, the intertitle "I'll kill his dog, Hugh Travers, as a warning".

On its release, it was shown with the Toto (Armando Novello) comedy short The Furniture Movers.

Re-release 
In 1922, the film was edited down to 3 reels, and released as a "Pathé Playlet".

References

External links 

 
 
 
 

1918 comedy-drama films
1918 lost films
American black-and-white films
1910s English-language films
American silent feature films
Films set in Manhattan
Lost American films
Pathé Exchange films
Lost comedy-drama films
1918 films
1910s American films
Silent American comedy-drama films